Acanthometridae is a family of radiolarians.

References

External links 
 Acanthometridae at the World Register of Marine Species (WoRMS)

Acantharea
Radiolarian families

tr:Acanthometra